Yankiel Rivera Figueroa (born September 10, 1997) is a Puerto Rican flyweight boxer. He is the only boxer in his country who qualified to participate in the 2020 Summer Olympics.

Boxing career
Rivera won bronze at the Pan American Youth Championships in Quito in 2014. He lost to Leandro Blanc in the quarter-finals of the 2016 continental Olympic qualification in Buenos Aires and competed at the 2017 World Boxing Championships in Hamburg, where he lost to the eventual runner-up Jasurbek Latipov in the preliminary round. At the 2018 Central American and Caribbean Games in Barranquilla and also at the 2019 Pan American Games in Lima, he won a bronze medal in the flyweight division.

Due to the COVID-19 pandemic, the American-continental Olympic qualification tournament in Buenos Aires planned for May 2021 was canceled and a qualification based on the continental ranking was decided instead, which secured Rivera a starting place as number 3 in the ranking.

Professional boxing record

References

1997 births
Living people
People from Toa Alta, Puerto Rico
Puerto Rican male boxers
Olympic boxers of Puerto Rico
Boxers at the 2020 Summer Olympics
Medalists at the 2019 Pan American Games
Pan American Games medalists in boxing
Boxers at the 2019 Pan American Games
Competitors at the 2018 Central American and Caribbean Games
Central American and Caribbean Games medalists in boxing
Flyweight boxers
Pan American Games bronze medalists for Puerto Rico